Joyce Woodhouse (born 1944) is an American politician and a former member of the Nevada Senate. She represented the 5th district from 2006 to 2010 and then from 2012 to 2019, when she became unable to run for re-election due to term limits.

Early life 
Woodhouse was born in Wibaux, Montana, in 1944. She was the oldest of five daughters and grew up on her father's Hereford cattle ranch. She attended Carroll College, where she received a bachelor's of arts degree in elementary education, and then the University of Nevada, Las Vegas, where she received two masters' degrees in curriculum and instruction and in educational leadership. She worked as a teacher, an elementary school principal and a program administrator. She was married to Al Wittenberg. She worked as a legislative lobbyist for the Nevada State Education Association.

Political career 
Woodhouse was first elected to the Nevada Senate in November 2006, holding office until November 2010.

She faced no opposition in the 2012 Democratic primary for the 5th Senate district and went on to challenge Republican Steve Kirk in the general election. She focused on the economy and education in her campaign, and won the election by 51.96% to 48.04%.

Woodhouse faced Nicholas Lash, a political newcomer inspired by senator and presidential candidate Bernie Sanders, in the 2016 Democratic primary. She won with 85.48% of the vote, and faced Republican Carrie Buck and Libertarian Tim Hagan in the general election. Woodhouse out-raised Buck by $500,000 to $140,000, and won re-election by less than one percentage point, winning by 47.89% to 47.03%.

In 2017, Woodhouse and fellow state senators Nicole Cannizzaro and Patricia Farley faced a recall effort led by Republican Stephen Silberkraus. The state Democratic party sued, stating that 5,500 signatures on the petition were invalid, as the result of people signing who were not registered to vote in Woodhouse's district or people who later asked to have their signatures removed. A separate lawsuit was filed by the party challenging the validity of the recall itself, led by lawyers Marc Elias and Bradley Schrager. In April 2018, Secretary of State Barbara Cegavske declared that the recall effort had failed to receive enough signatures following a recount.

She was co-minority whip in 2016 and then became the co-majority whip in 2017 and the chief majority whip in 2019.

References

External links
Project Vote Smart - Senator Joyce Woodhouse (NV) profile
Follow the Money - Joyce Woodhouse
2006 campaign contributions

Democratic Party Nevada state senators
1944 births
Living people
Women state legislators in Nevada
People from Glendive, Montana
21st-century American politicians
21st-century American women politicians